Les Cousins Dalton is a Lucky Luke comic written by Goscinny and Morris. It is the twelfth album in the Lucky Luke Series. The comic was printed by Dupuis in 1958 and by Cinebook in 2011 as The Dalton Cousins.

This album is the first of many Lucky Luke albums to feature the brothers Joe, William, Jack and Averell Dalton as significant characters (they appear briefly in the previous album Lucky Luke contre Joss Jamon as part of the jury set out to convict Lucky Luke). Within the Lucky Luke universe, they are cousins of the real-life Dalton Gang. (The "real" Daltons appeared in, and were killed off, in the earlier album Hors-la-loi.) As the story begins, the Dalton cousins are rather inept outlaws who aspire to become as notorious as their cousins, and vow to get even with Lucky Luke, the man responsible for their cousins' demise.

Synopsis 
Joe, William, Jack and Averell Dalton, the cousins of the authentic Dalton Brothers, dream of avenging the dead by killing Lucky Luke and becoming desperados as famous as their famous cousins. As they are bad as bandits, they follow an intensive training and become dreaded outlaws.

The Daltons turn to their vendetta against Lucky Luke, whom they find at Killer Gulch. The latter fools them when they play cards that the winner will have the pleasure of killing the cowboy: Luke provides them with cards (which only has aces) and the four brothers each have four aces. They start fighting each other, each believing that another is cheating. Luke meanwhile escapes. Then they go in pursuit of Luke before understanding that the latter is still in the town of Killer Gulch. To get him out, they blockade the city, preventing anyone from entering or exiting, and Luke agrees to a fight. Luke fights each Dalton with his bare hands and beats them one after the other. Impressed, the Daltons offer to Lucky Luke to become their accomplice. Luke apparently agrees and arranges to prevent the Daltons from committing crimes.

When the Daltons understand that they have been deceived, they separate and leave each other on their own to find Lucky Luke. Thus, Luke confronts and captures each Dalton one by one (going from Averell, the first to find him, to ending with Joe) and the four brothers go to jail.

Characters 

 The Daltons
Joe: The smallest, the most evil, "selfish, conceited, cruel and greedy", he has an unquenchable hatred for Lucky Luke; he is wanted for $5 at the start.
 William: Smaller than Jack and Averell, but taller than Joe; he is wanted for $2.50 at the start.
 Jack: Smaller than Averell, but taller than Joe and William, with William he is the "Greek chorus"; the reward for his capture is "an object of art in real plaster" at the start.
 Averell: The biggest and the dumbest, always hungry, "born-blunderer"; he is not wanted at the start.

References

 Morris publications in Spirou BDoubliées

External links
Lucky Luke official site album index 

Comics by Morris (cartoonist)
Lucky Luke albums
1958 graphic novels
Works by René Goscinny